Blake Alexander Jenner (born August 27, 1992) is an American actor. Jenner won the second season of Oxygen's The Glee Project and, as a result, portrayed Ryder Lynn on the Fox musical comedy-drama series Glee. He has since had starring and supporting roles in Everybody Wants Some!! (2016), The Edge of Seventeen (2016), American Animals (2018), and What/If (2019).

Early life
Jenner was born and raised in Miami, Florida, the son of Mitzy and Richard Vernon Jenner. His mother is of Cuban descent, from a family from Santiago de Cuba. He is the youngest of four sons and has three elder brothers, Mike, Derrick and Richard.

He grew up interested in music and film and began playing drums at age nine. He attended Felix Varela High School, where he joined the school's drama society Troupe 6162 and played varsity football and wrestling. Stating that he was "in love with improv and comedy" he began improvisation lessons and participated in stage productions at the Roxy Performing Arts Center. In 2008, he became a member of "Impromedy", a sketch comedy improv group based in Miami.

Career
Eager to pursue a career in acting, Jenner left Miami and moved to Los Angeles after graduating high school a year early, with just $2,500. While residing in California, he took on many jobs including a waiter, clothing store associate, and parrot salesman while auditioning for acting roles. He continually attended improv classes at The Groundlings, and eventually did a guest show with that company two years later. By 2011, he was cast in the short films Wurlitzer and The Truth In Being Right and the horror film Cousin Sarah. He also made a guest appearance on ABC Family's sitcom Melissa & Joey as Miller Collins.

In 2012, he was selected through industry channels to audition as one of 15 contestants on the second season of The Glee Project, a television reality show for which the prize was a guaranteed seven-episode arc on the following season of Glee. He was one of three finalists and ultimately won. After appearing as Ryder Lynn on the fourth season of Glee, he was later nominated and won the Teen Choice Award for Choice TV Breakout Star. Jenner, along with co-stars Jacob Artist, Becca Tobin, Alex Newell, and Melissa Benoist, was promoted to series regular status for the fifth season.

In the summer of 2013, Jenner wrote the screenplay for Billy Boy. He and Benoist went on Kickstarter to ask fans to help fund the project's production; as of December 11, 2013, the project has reached its $100,000 goal. Jenner was subsequently cast in the horror film Within. In late 2015, Jenner was cast in a recurring role as Adam Foster on Supergirl, playing opposite his then-wife Melissa Benoist, who stars as the series' title character. His first appearance aired on January 25, 2016.

In 2016, Jenner starred as Jake Bradford in Richard Linklater's comedy film Everybody Wants Some!!, which was released on March 30, and played Hailee Steinfeld's character's brother in the coming-of-age drama The Edge of Seventeen. He was in  the cast of Shawn Christensen's drama film The Vanishing of Sidney Hall, which premiered at the 2017 Sundance Film Festival and was released in 2018. He was in the cast of Bart Layton's crime drama film American Animals. It premiered at the 2018 Sundance Film Festival and was released in June 2018, by The Orchard and MoviePass Ventures. Jenner played Christian de Neuvillette in the Goodspeed Musical production's Cyrano at the Norma Terris Theatre in August and September 2018.

Jenner played Sean in What/If, Netflix's 2019 anthology neo-noir thriller series. In August 2019, it was announced that Jenner would star in Richard Linklater's film adaptation of Merrily We Roll Along, which would be shot over the course of twenty years. Jenner had been set to star alongside Beanie Feldstein and Ben Platt. On January 10, 2023, it was announced that Jenner would be replaced in Merrily We Roll Along by Paul Mescal.

Personal life
Jenner became engaged to his former Glee co-star Melissa Benoist in 2013 and the pair reportedly married in 2015. However, that same year, Benoist commented that they had been married "longer than anybody knows," with some sources claiming that the couple actually wed in 2013. Benoist filed for divorce in late December 2016, citing irreconcilable differences, and the divorce was finalized in December 2017.

In 2019, Benoist shared an Instagram video chronicling her experience as a survivor of domestic violence. Benoist suffered an injury in 2015 that tore her iris and left her pupil permanently enlarged. In her video she revealed that the injury to her iris was due to a phone being thrown at her during a domestic dispute in a relationship marked by repeated abuse. Jenner and Benoist were married at the time. Benoist also stated she had experienced extreme control, manipulation, and cycles of severe violence including being slapped, punched, shoved into a wall, dragged by her hair, and choked during the relationship. In October 2020, Jenner responded via an Instagram post in which he admitted to causing the eye injury and confirmed the infliction of abuse throughout the relationship. He also alleged that the abuse during their relationship had been mutual and that she had physically assaulted him during the relationship, resulting in injury. Benoist had previously stated in her original Instagram video that she began fighting back in defense against Jenner's attacks during their relationship.

Filmography

Film

Television

Video games

Stage

Regional

Off-Broadway

Awards and nominations

Discography

Notes

References

External links

 
 

1992 births
21st-century American male actors
American entertainers of Cuban descent
American male film actors
American male television actors
American male voice actors
Hispanic and Latino American male actors
Living people
Male actors from Miami
Musicians from Miami
Reality casting show winners
21st-century American singers
21st-century American male singers